The Rural Municipality of Willner No. 253 is a rural municipality (RM) in the Canadian province of Saskatchewan within Census Division No. 11 and  Division No. 5. It is located in the south-central portion of the province.

History 
The RM of Willner No. 253 incorporated as a rural municipality on January 1, 1913.

Geography 
The RM is between the RMs of Arm River No. 252 and Loreburn No. 254.

Demographics 

Government 
The RM of Willner No. 253 is governed by an elected municipal council and an appointed administrator that meets on the second Thursday of every month. The reeve of the RM is Len Palmer while its administrator is Yvonne (Bonny) Goodsman. The RM's office is located in Davidson.

References

External links 

Willner
Division No. 11, Saskatchewan